Marcallo con Casone is a comune (municipality) in the Metropolitan City of Milan in the Italian region Lombardy, located about  west of Milan.

Marcallo con Casone borders the following municipalities: Ossona, Mesero, Santo Stefano Ticino, Bernate Ticino, Magenta, Boffalora sopra Ticino.

Twin towns
Marcallo con Casone is twinned with:

  Bubry, France
  Macroom, Ireland

References

External links
 Official website

Cities and towns in Lombardy